Jaroslav Hellebrand (born 30 December 1945) is a Czech rower who competed for Czechoslovakia in the 1968 Summer Olympics, in the 1972 Summer Olympics, and in the 1976 Summer Olympics.

He was born in Prague.

In 1968 he and his partner Petr Krátký finished twelfth in the double sculls event.

Four years later he finished twelfth in the single sculls competition.

At the 1976 Games he was part of the Czechoslovak boat which won the bronze medal in the quadruple sculls contest.

References

External links
 

1945 births
Living people
Czech male rowers
Czechoslovak male rowers
Olympic rowers of Czechoslovakia
Rowers at the 1968 Summer Olympics
Rowers at the 1972 Summer Olympics
Rowers at the 1976 Summer Olympics
Olympic bronze medalists for Czechoslovakia
Olympic medalists in rowing
Medalists at the 1976 Summer Olympics
World Rowing Championships medalists for Czechoslovakia
Rowers from Prague
European Rowing Championships medalists